Michael Gassen "Mike" Stewart (April 19, 1945 – November 13, 2002) was the co-founder and guitarist for We Five and a Grammy nominee. As a music producer he produced Billy Joel's breakthrough Piano Man  album, as well as artists such as Tom Jones and Kenny Rankin, among others.

We Five, known for their relatively complex harmonies, released "You Were on My Mind", which reached No. 1 in Cashbox and No. 2 on Billboard'''s hits list (song remains a favorite on oldies radio playlists), and We Five received a best new group Grammy nomination. The next year, they had a Top 40 hit with "Let's Get Together".

Life and career
Stewart was the brother of John Stewart (1939–2008), a one-time member of The Kingston Trio and later a successful singer-songwriter, and the father of Jamie Stewart, frontman of the avant-garde group Xiu Xiu.

He left the music industry in the early 1990s and became a computer programmer. He designed systems for Digidesigns and for Adobe for use by musicians and arrangers. His technological creations include the Session8 Digital Audio Workstation for PC, the Impulse Drum Trigger, the Feel Factory, co-designed with George Daly, and the Human Clock, which instructs computerized musical devices to follow a human tempo.

He later played bass in his son's band The Indestructible Beat of Palo Alto (IBOPA).

Stewart died on November 13, 2002, reportedly a result of "a long illness." However, Jamie Stewart has acknowledged that his father's death was a suicide.

The track "Mike" from Xiu Xiu's album Fabulous Muscles concerns Jamie's reaction to his father's death.Wounds to Bind: A Memoir of the Folk-Rock Revolution'', a reminiscence by We Five co-founder Jerry Burgan incorporating Burgan's childhood friendship with Stewart, pondered Stewart's life, death and creative drive.

References

1945 births
2002 deaths
Record producers from California
Suicides in the United States
20th-century American guitarists
Guitarists from California